Maryal railway station (Urdu and Punjabi: مریال ریلوے اسٹیشن) is located in Shakagarh Tehsil, Narowal district of Punjab province of the Pakistan.

See also
 List of railway stations in Pakistan
 Pakistan Railways

References

Railway stations in Narowal district